Pogost Luka is a rural locality (a selo) in Vysokovskoye Rural Settlement, Ust-Kubinsky District, Vologda Oblast, Russia. The population was 41 as of 2002.

Geography 
Pogost Luka is located 21 km southeast of Ustye (the district's administrative centre) by road. Potepalovo is the nearest rural locality.

References 

Rural localities in Tarnogsky District